James Rippey (born 1977) is a Scottish born English international indoor and lawn bowler.

Currently ranked world number 21 by the World Bowls Tour(WBT 2019).

Career
He won the Scottish national fours title aged just 17. He went on to captain the U25s England outdoor side and has won the English indoor Triples title. He qualified for the 2016, 2017, 2019 (Singles & Pairs) and 2020 World Indoor Bowls Championships.

In 2018 he defeated the world champion Mark Dawes in the first round of the Scottish International Open.

References

Living people
English male bowls players
Scottish male bowls players
1978 births